The term Kleinbahn (literally 'small railway', plural: Kleinbahnen) was a light railway concept used especially in Prussia for a railway line that "on account of its low importance for general railway transport" had less strict requirements placed on its construction and operation that main lines (Hauptbahnen, Vollbahnen) or secondary lines (Nebenbahnen i.e. normal branch lines). Even public railway lines built for constructional or industrial purposes were counted as Kleinbahnen.

Origin and use 

The concept was defined in the Prussian Kleinbahn law of 28 July 1892, that was designed to encourage the construction of local railway lines by private companies. The word Kleinbahn was chosen by a majority of MPs in the Prussian parliament instead of a range of other options - Lokalbahn (local line), Bahn unterster Ordnung (line of the lowest order) or Bahn untergeordneter Bedeutung (line of secondary importance) - because it was neither a foreign word nor had negative overtones.

In several former German states such as (Mecklenburg, Oldenburg and Baden) the concept Kleinbahn was partially adopted for lines of limited length and light construction. In the other German-speaking states, the terms Lokalbahn (Baden, Bayern, Austria), Sekundärbahn (Saxony) or Vizinalbahn (Bayern) were preferred.

In everyday speech the term Kleinbahn is widely used as a synonym for narrow gauge lines or garden railways. Despite that, Kleinbahnen may be built in either  as well as in narrow gauge.

Construction and operation 

The construction and operation of Kleinbahnen were carried out to less stringent requirements, e.g. tracks were laid in a gravel rather than a normal ballast bed, and usually by private companies, which nevertheless in many cases involved substantial participation by the state, the province or local communities. The Kleinbahn company with the largest railway network in the whole of the German Empire was the 'Pomeranian state railways' (Pommerschen Landesbahnen) founded in 1940.

Today 
Except in Berlin, the Kleinbahn law has been superseded everywhere by new national railway laws. The former Kleinbahnen are classified today as Nebenbahnen (branch lines).

Model railway 

The name Kleinbahn, German for "small railway", is also the name of a model railway manufacturer based in Vienna. The company was founded in 1947 by Erich Klein. The HO-scale models produced by the company are destined primarily for the Austrian market: most of the models are based on Austrian Railway prototypes. Their current catalogue offers a selection of locomotives; passenger and freight rolling stock; track and switches as well as catenery and signaling equipment. Kleinbahn produces an economically priced product that is readily affordable to a wider market.  Kleinbahn has eschewed extreme detail and sophistication and has instead focused on the development and manufacture of models of a simpler and more robust finish. The models are not widely available as they are not available through the usual hobby shops. Instead, their product is available almost exclusively through company outlets located in a number of Austrian cities, including Vienna, where the company is headquartered, as well as Salzburg, Klagenfurt, Linz, and Bregenz, all in Austria. Their products may also be purchased by mail order. Unfortunately, since the time of this writing, all of Kleinbahn's stores, with the exception of their “flagship” store in Vienna have been shuttered. However, their models are still available by “mail” order. See their web site for details.

List of Kleinbahnen 

There is a list of German Kleinbahnen in the list of former German railway companies.

See also
German Railway Society which runs a preserved Kleinbahn museum railway near Bremen.
Light railway

External links
 Kleinbahn Co., : http://www.kleinbahn.com/kontakt_index.html
 Kleinbahn product catalog.: https://web.archive.org/web/20100216040441/http://www.kleinbahn.com/produkte_index.html

Rail transport in Germany